The 2015–16 season of the Hoofdklasse is competed in six leagues, three Saturday leagues and three Sunday leagues. The champions of each group will be promoted directly to the 2016–17 Derde Divisie. The 2015–16 Hoofdklasse started on Saturday 5 September 2014.

Teams

Saturday A

Saturday B

Saturday C

Sunday A

Sunday B

Sunday C

League tables

Saturday A

Saturday B

Saturday C

Sunday A

Sunday B

Sunday C

Promotion/relegation play-off Derde Divisie – Hoofdklasse 
Both for the Saturday and Sunday leagues applies the same systematic.

The team ranked 15th in the Topklasse and the 3 period winners of the 3 leagues (9 teams), making a total of 10 teams participate in the play-offs.

In previous years these 10 teams would compete in 3 rounds for a spot in the Topklasse. In the first round the 3 period winners of each league would compete first for a spot in the second round (3 teams). Only in the second round the team ranked 15th in the Topklasse would join, making the total at that moment 4 teams. These 4 teams would participate in a 2-round 2 leg system for 1 spot in next seasons Topklasse. The other 9 teams would play next season in the Hoofdklasse.

With the introduction of the new league system, from Topklasse and Hoofdklasse to Tweede Divisie, Derde Divisie and Hoofdklasse, the number of spots for now the Derde Divisie was increased from 1 to 5.

As a result, the 10 teams are right away paired up to play a 1-round 2 leg knockout system. The 5 winners play next season in the 2016–17 Derde Divisie and the 5 losers in the 2016–17 Hoofdklasse.

For details and results see 2015–16 Derde Divisie / Hoofdklasse promotion/relegation play-offs.

Promotion/relegation play-off Hoofdklasse – Eerste Klasse

Saturday 
The teams ranked 11th and 12th of each of the 3 Saturday leagues (6 teams) and the 3 period winners of each of the 5 Saturday Eerste Klasse leagues (15 teams), making a total of 21 teams participate in the play-offs.

In previous years these 21 teams were split up into 7 groups of 3 teams each. The winner of each group would play next season in the Hoofdklasse and the remaining teams in the Eerste Klasse.

With the introduction of the new league system, from Topklasse and Hoofdklasse to Tweede Divisie, Derde Divisie and Hoofdklasse, the number of Hoofdklasse Saturday leagues was reduced from 3 to 2.

As a result, the 21 teams are not competing any more for 7 spots in the Hoofdklasse, but only for 3 spots.

To accomplish this, the 21 teams are first split into 3 groups of 7 teams each. All 7 teams in 1 group playing each other would be too time-consuming. Therefore, each group of 7 teams is split up further into 2 subgroups or poules. One poule of 4 and one poule of 3 teams. The split is made in such a way that there will be a team, which played this season in the Hoofdklasse, in each of the poules (6 total).

In the first round each poule will play a semi competition. In the poules with 3 teams, each team will play one match at home and one match away. In the poules with 4 teams, 2 teams will play two matches at home and one match away, and the other 2 teams will play only one match at home and two matches away.

In the second round, the 2 winners of the poules within a group decide which team will play next season the Hoofdklasse.

First round

Group 1

Poule A

Poule B

Group 2

Poule A

Poule B

Groep 3

Poule A

Poule B

Second round 

Source:

Sunday 
The teams ranked 11th and 12th of each of the 3 Sunday leagues (6 teams) and the 3 period winners of each of the 6 Sunday Eerste Klasse leagues (18 teams), making a total of 24 teams participate in the play-offs.

In previous years these 24 teams played in a 2-round 2 leg knockout system. The 6 winners of the second/final round would play next season in the Hoofdklasse and the remaining teams in the Eerste Klasse.

With the introduction of the new league system, from Topklasse and Hoofdklasse to Tweede Divisie, Derde Divisie and Hoofdklasse, the number of Hoofdklasse Sunday leagues was reduced from 3 to 2.

As a result, the 24 teams are not competing any more for 6 spots in the Hoofdklasse, but only for 2 spots. However, since the Topklasse club WKE went bankrupt and therefore their team didn't relegate to the Hoofdklasse, an extra spot became available. So the teams could compete for 3 spots.

To go from 24 to 3 teams the teams play a 3-round 2 leg knockout system. The teams are paired in a way that two teams, which played this season in the Hoofdklasse, can't meet until the final third round.

Sources:,

References 

2015-16
Neth
4